FK Lyubertsy is a Russian football team from Lyubertsy. It played professionally in 1946, 1966–1969 and 1990–1998. Their best result was 5th place in the Soviet Second League in 1946.

Team name history
 1937: founded as FK Selmash Lyubertsy
 1946: FK Traktor Lyubertsy
 1950: FK Torpedo Lyubertsy
 1987: FK Torgmash Lyubertsy
 2008: FK Torpedo Lyubertsy
 2009: FK Torpedo-Zenit Lyubertsy
 2010: FK Torpedo Lyubertsy
 2011: FK Lyubertsy

External links
  Team history at KLISF

Association football clubs established in 1937
Association football clubs disestablished in 2004
Defunct football clubs in Russia
Football in Moscow Oblast
1937 establishments in Russia